Courtney Audain is an American bass guitarist and musician. He is best known as a member of the band Timbuk 3. Audain joined the band in 1991 and remained until their break-up in 1995.

References

American rock bass guitarists
Year of birth missing (living people)
Living people
Timbuk3 members